Sibylle Elisabeth of Württemberg (10 April 1584 - 20 January 1606), was a German Princess member of the House of Württemberg and by marriage Duchess of Saxony.

Born in Mömpelgard, she was the third of fifteen children born from the marriage of Duke Frederick I of Württemberg and Sibylla, daughter of Prince Joachim Ernest, Prince of Anhalt.

Life
Duke Frederick I sought the connection to the House of Saxony and searched for a match for Sybille Elisabeth (his eldest daughter) among the Protestant princes who were allies of the German Empire and were supportive of his quest for formal vassal ties to the House of Habsburg.

She married John George I, Elector of Saxony on 16 September 1604. As wittum, she was given the castle, city, and jurisdiction of Weißensee. The couple were granted a separate court which was mainly financed with revenue from the Bishopric of Merseburg.

Sybille Elisabeth was known for providing free medicines to the needy, but suddenly died aged 21 in Dresden after the birth of her only child, a stillborn son. She was buried in Freiburg Cathedral (also known as St Mary's Cathedral).

References
Ute Essegern: Fürstinnen am kursächsischen Hof. Leipziger Universitätsverlag, 2007, p. 227. (online) [retrieved 4 November 2014].
Tobias Adami: Triumphus Veneris in nuptis …: Hochzeitsglückwünsche für Johann Georg Herzog von Sachsen und Sibylle Elisabeth von Württemberg, Tochter des Friedrich Herzog von Württemberg, Sept. 1604. Stoeckel, 1604.

1584 births
1606 deaths
Princesses of Württemberg
Duchesses of Saxony
⚭Sibylle Elisabeth of Württemberg
Deaths in childbirth
Burials at Freiberg Cathedral
Daughters of monarchs